Diego Ulissi (born 15 July 1989) is an Italian road bicycle racer, who currently rides for UCI WorldTeam .

Career
Ulissi is a versatile, all-round cyclist who often wins stages and one-day races from breakaways and over hilly terrain.

Born in Cecina, Ulissi won the Junior World Road Race Championships in 2006 and 2007. He is the second cyclist ever – after Giuseppe Palumbo – to achieve two consecutive World Junior Road titles. He was awarded stage 17 of the 2011 Giro d'Italia after Giovanni Visconti was relegated for improper sprinting.

Lampre–Farnese Vini (2010–present)
In June 2011, he recorded his first major professional victories. He won Stage 17 in his first appearance at the Giro d'Italia after Giovanni Visconti was relegated for improper sprinting. Ulissi and Visconti were part of a breakaway that survived to the end of the hilly stage, and Visconti shoved Ulissi during their sprint to the finish line. Ulissi later won the queen stage and the overall classification in that year's Tour of Slovenia.

During the 2012 season, Ulissi again raced the Giro d'Italia, placing fourth in the young rider competition.

Ulissi took his second World Tour-level win during the first stage of the 2013 Tour de Pologne, out-sprinting Darwin Atapuma and Rafał Majka from a breakaway group of 15 riders. He then won three Italian classic races in the fall. In Milano–Torino, Ulissi attacked away from a small group of favourites, including defending champion Alberto Contador, on the final climb to take victory. He won an uphill sprint in Coppa Sabatini a week later. Finally, days after, Ulissi again jumped away from the leading group in the closing metres of the Giro dell'Emilia to take victory.

Ulissi took more stage victories in 2014, despite underperforming during the spring classics. He won the second stage of the Tour Down Under, launching an early sprint to beat stage favourite Simon Gerrans. Ulissi won two stages in the Giro d'Italia. On Stage 5, he launched a late attack against a group of stage and general classification favourites, and he narrowly beat the Giro's overall contenders to the finish of the race's first major mountain stage.

After serving a doping-related suspension that ended in March 2015, Ulissi came back to win Stage 7 of the Giro d'Italia in Fiuggi. In 2016, Ulissi returned to the Giro d'Italia and won two stages. On Stage 4, Ulissi broke away from the leading group to beat Tom Dumoulin by five seconds. On Stage 11, he out-sprinted race leader Bob Jungels in the closing metres of the stage. Ulissi won the first individual time trial of his professional career on Stage 2 of the Tour of Slovenia, beating eventual general classification winner Rein Taaramäe over a short and hilly parcours. That August, Ulissi took the third stage and the overall classification at the Czech Cycling Tour.

In June 2017, he was named in the startlist for the Tour de France. He out-sprinted Jesús Herrada and Tom-Jelte Slagter to win the Grand Prix Cycliste de Montréal, his first World Tour-level win in the 2017 season. Ulissi won the general classification in the Presidential Tour of Turkey, his first overall victory in a World Tour stage race. In that race, he took the leader's jersey in a solo hilltop stage victory on Stage 4.

Ulissi won Stage 5 of the 2018 Tour de Suisse, overpowering Enric Mas in a sprint to the line.

In 2019, Ulissi took victory in the Gran Premio di Lugano in Switzerland. He also won Stage 3 and the general classification in the Tour of Slovenia and the test event for the road race at the 2020 Summer Olympics in Tokyo.

Doping
In June 2014 it was announced that Ulissi had failed a drug test on Stage 11 of that year's Giro d'Italia. He tested positive for the asthma drug salbutamol, which is found in Ventolin. Ulissi had received permission to use Ventolin to treat a bronchospasm. However, the test indicated that he had almost twice the permitted concentration of salbutamol in his urine. He had also received paracetamol from a race doctor after he was involved in a crash during the stage.

Both Ulissi and the  team doctor denied using his inhaler to gain a competitive advantage, claiming that Ulissi had taken only two puffs before the start of the stage.  and the head coach of Italy's national team, Davide Cassani, expressed support for Ulissi.

Ulissi appealed to the Union Cycliste Internationale (UCI) for a controlled excretion study, as he could face a two-year suspension from racing. After some delay, the UCI passed Ulissi's case to Swiss Cycling (Ulissi resides outside of Lugano) to conduct a disciplinary hearing. Ulissi argued that his crash during the Giro's Stage 11 could have caused higher-than-expected levels of salbutamol. After briefly suspending Ulissi when news of his positive test broke,  announced that Ulissi could return to race in time for a string of Italian one-day races, including Tre Valli Varesine and Coppa Ugo Agostoni. But when Ulissi's case was passed to Swiss Cycling, the team backtracked, citing "internal sanitary rules of the team and the rules of the Mouvement pour un cyclisme crédible (MPCC)." The Swiss Olympic Association agreed with Ulissi's defence, that he used salbutamol negligently and not in order to cheat. He therefore received a reduced nine-month suspension, ending in March 2015.

The team was a member of the Mouvement pour un cyclisme crédible (MPCC), a voluntary association of teams working to promote clean cycling. MPCC rules prohibited a member team from signing a rider within two years of that rider serving a doping-related suspension of longer than six months. The rules could have prevented  from allowing Ulissi to return to racing after his suspension; however, because Ulissi already had a contract with the team, he could sue if  ended his contract early. The MPCC at first allowed  to keep its contract with Ulissi to avoid legal difficulties, and Ulissi returned to racing for the Tour of the Basque Country. However, the MPCC and  continued sparring over Ulissi's participation in races, prompting the team to withdraw from the MPCC in March 2015.

Personal life
Ulissi was born in Cecina in 1989. He was named Diego Armando after Diego Maradona, his father's favourite football player. Ulissi's mother, Donatella, works at a winery, while his father was a mountain bike racer. His father encouraged his passion for cycling, and Ulissi entered his first race in 1996.

Ulissi lives outside of Lugano, Switzerland with his wife, Arianna, and daughters, Lia and Anna. He missed Anna's birth in March 2020 while in quarantine at the UAE Tour after four riders on  tested positive for COVID-19.

Major results

2006
 1st  Road race, UCI Junior World Championships
 2nd Overall Giro della Lunigiana
1st Stage 3
2007
 1st  Road race, UCI Junior World Championships
 3rd Time trial, National Junior Road Championships
 4th Overall Giro della Lunigiana
 8th Time trial, UEC European Junior Road Championships
2009
 3rd GP Capodarco
2010
 1st Gran Premio Industria e Commercio di Prato
 4th Overall Brixia Tour
 9th Giro di Toscana
2011
 1st  Overall Tour of Slovenia
1st Stage 2
 1st Stage 17 Giro d'Italia
 2nd Overall Settimana Internazionale di Coppi e Bartali
1st  Young rider classification
 3rd Overall Brixia Tour
2012
 1st Gran Premio Industria e Commercio Artigianato Carnaghese
 2nd Milano–Torino
 3rd Overall Settimana Internazionale di Coppi e Bartali
1st  Points classification
1st  Young rider classification
1st Stages 3 & 4
 6th Grand Prix Cycliste de Québec
 9th La Flèche Wallonne
 10th Clásica de San Sebastián
2013
 1st  Overall Settimana Internazionale di Coppi e Bartali
1st Stage 2
 1st Milano–Torino
 1st Coppa Sabatini
 1st Giro dell'Emilia
 1st Stage 1 Tour de Pologne
 2nd Gran Premio Città di Camaiore
 2nd Gran Premio della Costa Etruschi
 4th Trofeo Laigueglia
 6th Overall Bayern–Rundfahrt
1st  Young rider classification
 7th Overall Paris–Nice
2014
 1st Gran Premio Città di Camaiore
 Giro d'Italia
1st Stages 5 & 8
 3rd Overall Tour Down Under
1st Stage 2
 3rd Gran Premio di Lugano
 5th Trofeo Laigueglia
2015
 1st Memorial Marco Pantani
 1st Stage 7 Giro d'Italia
 2nd Japan Cup
 3rd Road race, National Road Championships
 5th Overall Tour of Slovenia
 5th Overall Abu Dhabi Tour
 5th Grand Prix Cycliste de Québec
 6th Overall Tour de Pologne
2016
 1st  Overall Czech Cycling Tour
1st Stage 3
 1st Circuito de Getxo
 Giro d'Italia
1st Stages 4 & 11
 1st Stage 3 (ITT) Tour of Slovenia
 2nd Coppa Ugo Agostoni
 2nd Gran Premio di Lugano
 2nd Tre Valli Varesine
 3rd Overall Tour du Haut Var
 3rd Overall Abu Dhabi Tour
 3rd Gran Premio della Costa Etruschi
 3rd Grand Prix Cycliste de Montréal
 5th Milano–Torino
 6th Trofeo Laigueglia
 7th Strade Bianche
 7th Amstel Gold Race
 7th Grand Prix Cycliste de Québec
 8th La Flèche Wallonne
 8th Giro dell'Emilia
 9th Road race, UEC European Road Championships
2017
 1st  Overall Tour of Turkey
1st Stage 4
 1st Grand Prix Cycliste de Montréal
 1st Gran Premio della Costa Etruschi
 2nd Road race, National Road Championships
 2nd Memorial Marco Pantani
 4th Coppa Sabatini
 4th Tre Valli Varesine
 5th Overall Tour Down Under
 7th Giro dell'Emilia
 10th La Flèche Wallonne
2018
 4th Overall Tour Down Under
 4th Overall Tour of Turkey
 4th Gran Premio di Lugano
 7th Overall Abu Dhabi Tour
 7th Grand Prix Cycliste de Montréal
 9th Overall Tour de Suisse
1st Stage 5
 10th Giro della Toscana
2019
 1st  Overall Tour of Slovenia
1st Stage 3
 1st Gran Premio di Lugano
 1st Tokyo 2020 Test Event
 2nd Grand Prix Cycliste de Montréal
 3rd Overall Tour de Pologne
 3rd La Flèche Wallonne
 4th Road race, National Road Championships
 4th Grand Prix Cycliste de Québec
 5th Overall Deutschland Tour
 6th Giro dell'Emilia
 9th Overall Tour Down Under
2020
 1st  Overall Tour de Luxembourg
1st  Points classification
1st Stages 1 & 4
 Giro d'Italia
1st Stages 2 & 13
Held  after Stages 2–3
 2nd Overall Tour Down Under
 2nd Gran Piemonte
 3rd Giro dell'Emilia
 4th Overall Settimana Internazionale di Coppi e Bartali
 5th Overall Tour de Pologne
 8th Giro di Lombardia
 9th Overall UAE Tour
2021
 1st  Overall Settimana Ciclistica Italiana
1st Stages 1 & 4
 2nd Overall Tour of Slovenia
1st Stage 4
 3rd Giro della Toscana
 4th Overall Tour de Pologne
 5th Gran Premio di Lugano
 6th Veneto Classic
 7th Milano–Torino
 7th Giro dell'Appennino
 8th Giro dell'Emilia
2022
 1st GP Industria & Artigianato di Larciano
 2nd Overall Tour du Limousin
1st Stage 3
 6th Overall Étoile de Bessèges
 6th Overall Settimana Internazionale di Coppi e Bartali
 6th Giro del Veneto
 7th Trofeo Laigueglia
 8th Grand Prix La Marseillaise
 9th Overall Tour de Pologne
 9th Grand Prix Cycliste de Québec
 10th Grand Prix of Aargau Canton
 10th Veneto Classic
2023
 5th Overall Tour of Oman
1st Stage 4
 6th Muscat Classic
 9th Trofeo Laigueglia

Grand Tour general classification results timeline

Classics results timeline

See also
List of doping cases in cycling

References

External links

Italian male cyclists
1989 births
Living people
Sportspeople from the Province of Livorno
Italian Giro d'Italia stage winners
Italian sportspeople in doping cases
Doping cases in cycling
Presidential Cycling Tour of Turkey winners
People from Cecina, Tuscany
Cyclists from Tuscany
Tour de Suisse stage winners